Amblytropidia mysteca, the brown winter grasshopper, is a species of slant-faced grasshopper in the family Acrididae. It is found in Central America and North America.

References

Further reading

External links

 

Gomphocerinae
Articles created by Qbugbot
Insects described in 1861